Tyler Stenson is a singer/songwriter of "Elegant Folk" music from Portland, Oregon. He was born in Lander, Wyoming in 1981 and raised in Oregon. Known for his lyrically-driven, "eloquent Americana" music and unique writing process Stenson has been twice-named the "Performing Songwriter of the Year" (2007 and 2008) by the Portland Songwriters Association and "Best Male Artist" at the 2011 Portland Music Awards.

From 2000 to 2005, Stenson was the front man and chief singer/songwriter for the pop-rock group Rhetoric Tuesday based in Eugene, OR and from 2005 to 2007, he acted as front man for the Portland-based folk-rock band Lander. He has been a solo singer/songwriter since the dissolving of Lander in 2007.

Stenson has written and composed a total of 9 albums to date: Princess Willy LP (2000), The Low Ceiling EP (2002), Moose Lodge Sessions LP (2004), Orange Chrome Sky LP (2006), Lander Live at Mississippi Studios LP (2007), See That Gleam LP (2008), Bittersweet Parade LP (2010), Long Before the Wheel EP (2010) and Another Gleam LP (2011). The 2010 EP, Long Before the Wheel, was community-funded through a Kickstarter.

Although residing and based in Portland, Stenson was a singer/songwriter in Nashville, TN for two years. While in Tennessee, Stenson recorded two studio albums (Long Before the Wheel and Another Gleam), performed at many of the city's songwriting venues, including the legendary Bluebird Cafe, and toured the Southeast region of the United States.

Stenson has opened for Chris Isaak, Alpha Rev, LeRoy Bell from the American television series X Factor and Justin Hopkins from the NBC television series The Voice.

In early 2012, General Motors (Chevy Division) used two of Stenson's original compositions within their national advertising campaigns; "The Road" was featured on a Chevy Silverado campaign and "We Grow" was featured on a frequently aired Chevy Volt "Just the Facts" commercial, featuring a voice over by Tim Allen.

References 

1981 births
Living people
Musicians from Portland, Oregon
Songwriters from Oregon
American folk singers
Singers from Oregon
21st-century American singers